The Knight is the name of three fictional comic book superheroes who are properties of DC Comics.

Percival Sheldrake debuted as the Knight in Batman #62 (December 1950), and was created by Bill Finger and Dick Sprang. Cyril Sheldrake debuted as the Knight in JLA #26 (February 1999), and was created by Grant Morrison and Howard Porter. Beryl Hutchinson first appeared as Squire in the same issue, and became the Knight in Batman Incorporated v2 #09 (March 2013).

Publication history

Percival Sheldrake 
The first Knight first appeared in Batman #62 (Dec 1950/Jan 1951) in a story entitled "The Batman of England!" He is a British vigilante who models himself after the Knights of the Round Table, and also gentleman detective after the Batman, including having a teenage sidekick, the Squire. He is Percy Sheldrake, Earl of Wordenshire, and the Squire is his son Cyril. Instead of a Bat-Signal he is summoned by ringing the Wordenshire church bell. The Knight is a member of the Batmen of All Nations—also known as the Club of Heroes—an international team of superheroes whose careers were inspired by Batman's example.

It is later revealed that Percy had begun his heroic career as squire to the Shining Knight during World War II. Percy was murdered by the villain Spring Heeled Jack. His son Cyril, the former Squire, assumed the mantle.

Cyril Sheldrake 
The second Knight first appears in a group shot of the Ultramarine Corps at the end of JLA #26 (Feb 1999). The subsequent appearance of the Corps in JLA Classified establishes that he is Cyril Sheldrake, who inherited both the title of Earl and that of the Knight when his father was killed by his arch-enemy, Springheeled Jack. Worrying he wouldn't live up to his father's formidable reputation as a hero Cyril turned to drink and gambling, even losing Sheldrake castle at one point due to his debts. It was then that a young girl named Beryl rescued him from the gutter (at the behest of her mother) and helped the knight clean up his act offering him a room and even use of her garage as his Superhero HQ. Cyril repaid her kindness by training her to be his squire.
Cyril has since excelled at his task as Britain's primary defender of the innocent and joined several international hero groups (International Ultramarine Corp, Batman Inc., etc.)

Gadgets 
The Knight's current motorcycle is named Anastasia, after Dan Dare's spaceship, and has a stylized horse's head. Anastasia has a chemical tracking system built into her "nose". It is also of considerably tougher construction than a standard motorbike, surviving a head on jousting match with a Richard the Third clone suffering no significant damage.
He also employs a squadron of miniaturized Spitfires under his control. Not only can they be used offensively against a variety of enemies, they can also see in various wavelengths and have been used to follow the trail of a serial killer.
His armor as well as providing protection from attack also contains a variety of visual scanners and communication devices in the visor.
The armor is even capable of moving independently of him; an experiment to make the armor continue fighting even when Cyril was unconscious resulted in it becoming self-aware and attacking. Squire generally handles the communications and computer side of things whilst his American man servant Hank Hackenbacker services and builds the bulk of his vehicles and machines as well as offering annoyingly sage advice when needed.

Allies 
 Captain Cornwall and his son Cornwall Boy (sharing unspecified magical gifts)
 Rush Hour 1, 2 and 3 (Anglo-Indian speedsters of the Sikh religion)
 Milk Man (powers unknown but does possess a dangerous bottle of "Gold Top")
 The Fro (man with giant hair do) 
 The Distinguished Gentlemen (finely dressed crime fighter)
 Birthday Girl (stark naked super heroine with strategically placed balloons)
 The Mechanic (wears a brown overcoat and a welder's mask, powers unknown)

Batman: Battle for the Cowl 

In Battle for the Cowl, The Knight, along with Squire, is a member of the Network, a group of heroes whom the Bat-Family trusted to assist them if the need arose. Knight is seen assisting Dick Grayson (the current Batman, who as of the time was still Nightwing, de facto leader of the Network) in quelling the chaos in Gotham which erupted with the rumors of Batman's death.

Batman and Robin 

Knight also appears in Batman and Robin #7-9, where Batman (Dick Grayson) asks for his help in locating the last Lazarus Pit in order to bring Bruce Wayne back to life. Knight placed Batman's corpse in the Lazarus Pit before Grayson and Squire's arrival, and he, along with Batwoman, Squire, and Batman, is the first one to see the corpse of Batman (Bruce Wayne) returned to life. However, they soon discover that the corpse was in fact a clone of Batman, and not Batman himself. This copy has a defect, making him mad and impossible to control.

Knight and Squire 
Writer Paul Cornell has written a six-issue Knight and Squire limited series with artist Jimmy Broxton and cover artist Yanick Paquette. The first issue was published in October 2010.

As shown in the limited series, the Knight is still based in Sheldrake Castle, Great Worden, Wordenshire, which has been equipped in a similar manner to the Batcave. The Knight's current motorcycle is named Anastasia, after Dan Dare's spaceship, and has a stylized horse's head. Anastasia has a chemical tracking system built into her "nose". It is also of considerably tougher construction than a standard motorbike, surviving a head on jousting match with a Richard the Third clone suffering no significant damage.

The Knight is portrayed as something of an elder statesman to other British superheroes, including Captain Cornwall (the heir to Merlin's power) and Rush Hour I to III (an Asian British family of speedsters). He is also on good terms with some "villains" who duplicate the gimmickry of Batman villains without actually committing any crimes, such as Jarvis Poker, the British Joker. The Knight and Squire have a longstanding enmity with agents of an alternate universe in which Britain is a fascist state.

In #4, shortly after his father's death, Cyril sank into a drunken state, before being rescued by Beryl. During this period he was briefly a villain, paying off gambling debts to a criminal named Mad Hat Harry.

Issue #1
Knight and Squire are enjoying a night in the pub, called "The Time in a Bottle", with various other superheroes and their villainous counterparts. Squire meets a handsome wannabe villain, Shrike, but the evening is interrupted when the binding spell protecting the pub's clientele from harming each other is undone. Violent chaos ensues as old scores are settled in the one neutral location in the land. Knight and Squire must find who counteracted the magic and end the mother of all meta pub punch-ups.

Issue #2
After detecting dark dimensional energy from a village in Dorset, Knight and Squire go in civilian guise to root out its cause. They quickly discover a cabal of racist Morris dancers hoping to bring about a "yesteryear" Britain free of bloody foreigners and homosexuals.

Issue #3
C.O.R. Labs (Council for Organised Research) not only perfects the art of human cloning but decides to try and resurrect ancient English king Richard the Third, complete with memories. Knight and Squire have a bad feeling about the project and resolve to keep an eye on it. Meanwhile, it is clear Richard is still the power-hungry mad man depicted by Shakespeare, as he quickly kills Professor Meriweather, the head of the project, and proceeds to clone yet more despotic monarchs. Each are determined to carve up Britain into their own feudal territories.

Issue #4
Shrike flies in to castle Sheldrake to visit Squire (Beryl) and hopefully pick up where they left off in issue 1. Meanwhile, Cyril Sheldrake and his loyal man servant/tech genius Hank are working on a new project to upgrade the knight armor's A.I.

After a copy of Cyril's mind is transferred to the suit, it awakens believing itself to be the real Knight and attacks the "fake".

Issue #5
Jarvis Poker, the charming and completely benign "supervillain", goes on an ineffectual crime spree which succeeded in making the public laugh at his antics. Beryl figures out from her previous conversation in the Time in a Bottle pub that Jarvis is dying and this is his last "hurrah".
Rather than stop him, Knight and Squire resolve to give him a great send off by convincing the media he's a dangerous criminal and plotting the crime of the century. Next he "attacks" the Lincoln Arts Centre holding the contestants of the Britovision Song Contest hostage. The heroes arrive to make a good show of stopping Poker.

Issue #6
Jarvis Poker has been taken hostage by the Joker, who despises Tribute acts. He decides to cause some real chaos and goes on a killing spree targeting British heroes dragging Jarvis along for the ride. Next he attaches mind controlling joker masks to innocent people to cause further mayhem. Meeting at Stonehenge, Knight rallies the British heroes (and villains) to action, reminding them not to hurt the mind-controlled slaves. Squire is able to get a secret message to Jarvis and under duress leads the Joker to the source of magic.

Batman Incorporated and death 
After joining the Batman Incorporated global initiative, Knight had his neck broken in combat with a giant clone of Damian Wayne, a henchman of a global crime organization led by Talia al Ghul.

He has a state funeral back in London, his coffin draped in the Union Flag is paraded through the streets while huge crowds of mourners line the procession path. The Prime Minister talks about the possibility of resurrecting him.

Beryl Hutchinson 
Following the death of Cyril Sheldrake in Batman Inc. v2 #6 (2013), Beryl Hutchinson takes on the mantle of the Knight in #9.

In other media
The Percival Sheldrake incarnation of Knight makes a non-speaking cameo appearance in the Batman: The Brave and the Bold episode "Powerless!" as a member of the Batmen of All Nations.

Notes

References

External links
Knight I at the DCU Guide
Knight II at the DCU Guide
Knight at the DC Database Project

Comics characters introduced in 1950
Comics characters introduced in 1999
Characters created by Grant Morrison
DC Comics female superheroes
DC Comics superheroes
British superheroes
Fictional knights
Fictional female knights
Fictional swordfighters in comics
Characters created by Bill Finger
Characters created by Dick Sprang